Mary Forrest George, née Baxter (24 January 1940 – 12 July 2010), well known as Elizabeth Thornton (her mother's name) is a British-Canadian writer of 31 historical romance novels from 1986 to 2010.

Biography
Born Mary Forrest Baxter on 24 January 1940 Aberdeen, Scotland, the younger of two children of Elizabeth Thornton and Andrew Baxter. In 1959, she married Forbes George, and they had three sons: Stephen, Peter and Thomas.

She was an elementary school teacher before establishing the St. Swithin Street Nursery School in 1967. In 1969, she and her husband and their three sons moved to Winnipeg, Manitoba, Canada, where she continued her teaching career. In 1977, she was appointed as a Pastoral Assistant of a Presbyterian Church in Winnipeg. In 1985, she completed an honors degree in Classical Greek winning the Gold Medal in Classics. Her honor's thesis was entitled "Women in Euripides."

She published her first novel in 1987 as Elizabeth Thornton, her mother's maiden name, and a year later she became a full-time writer.

Mary George died on July 12, 2010 in Winnipeg, Manitoba, Canada.

Bibliography

Single novels 
Bluestocking Bride November 1987 
A Virtuous Lady March 1988 
The Passionate Prude October 1988 reprinted as To Love an Earl in 2004  
Fallen Angel April 1989 
The Worldly Widow January 1990 
Scarlet Angel August 1990 reprinted October 2005 
Highland Fire January 1994 
The Bride's Bodyguard April 1997 reprinted September 2006 
You Only Love Twice March 1998 
Strangers at Dawn November 1999 
Shady Lady February 2004

The Seers of Grampian series 

 The Runaway McBride February 2009 
 The Scot and I June 2009 
 A Bewitching Bride 2010

Devereux Family Saga series 
Tender the Storm May 1991 
Velvet is the Night April 1992 
Cherished September 1993

Dangerous series 
Dangerous to Love June 1994 
Dangerous to Kiss April 1995 
Dangerous to Hold April 1996

Princess series 
Whisper his Name March 1999 
Princess Charming February 2001 
The Perfect Princess November 2001 
Almost a Princess January 2003 
Shady Lady is in some ways a continuation of this series

The Trap series 
The Marriage Trap July 2005 
The Bachelor Trap April 2006 
The Pleasure Trap July 2007

Anthologies in collaboration 
"Sheer Sorcery" in Christmas Holiday November 1990
"The Trouble with Angels" in My Guardian Angel February 1995 (with Sandra Chastain, Kay Hooper, Susan Krinard and Karyn Monk)

References and sources

External links
Elizabeth Thornton's Official Homepage
Elizabeth Thornton's in Fantastic Fiction

1940 births
2010 deaths
Scottish romantic fiction writers
Canadian romantic fiction writers
Writers of historical romances
Scottish historical novelists
Writers of historical fiction set in the early modern period
20th-century Scottish novelists